Rie Ueno (born June 11, 1976) is a female long-distance runner from Japan, who is best known for winning the women's 5,000 metres at the 1999 Summer Universiade.

She won the first ever women's race at the Kagawa Marugame Half Marathon in 2000, finishing in a time of 1:09:57.

International competitions

Personal bests
5000 metres - 15:28.73 min (1999)
Half marathon - 1:09:57 hrs (2000)

References

1976 births
Living people
Japanese female long-distance runners
Universiade medalists in athletics (track and field)
Universiade gold medalists for Japan
Medalists at the 1999 Summer Universiade
Japan Championships in Athletics winners
20th-century Japanese women
21st-century Japanese women